Imagineer may refer to:

Imagineering, a term for creative engineering, coined by Alcoa Corporation and made famous by the Walt Disney Company
Walt Disney Imagineering, design and development arm of The Walt Disney Company, responsible for the creation of theme parks
 Imagineer (Japanese company), a Japanese video game, mobile, software company
 Imagineer Systems, a visual effects software company
 Imagineering (company), the in-house studio of Absolute Entertainment.